The American Vegetarian Party was a United States right-wing political party formed on July 28, 1947 at the Commodore Hotel in New York City, New York. It was founded by a group of five hundred delegates to the American Naturopathic Association's 1947 convention. The party held conventions and nominated candidates for President and Vice-President in several national elections, although they never seriously pursued ballot access or official recognition as a political party by election officials.

Historical Vegetarian Party presidential tickets

1948
 John Maxwell (Vegetarian Party presidential nominee) - Maxwell was born in England, and thus determined to be ineligible.
 Symon Gould (1948 Vegetarian Party vice-presidential nominee)

1952
  Daniel J. Murphy (Vegetarian Party presidential nominee) - Herbert C. Holdridge was originally the party's 1952 nominee for president, but in October, he withdrew and was replaced by Daniel J. Murphy.
  Symon Gould (1952 Vegetarian Party vice-presidential nominee)

1956
  Herbert M. Shelton (Vegetarian Party presidential nominee)
  Symon Gould (1956 Vegetarian Party vice-presidential nominee)

1960
  Symon Gould (1960 Vegetarian Party presidential nominee)
  Christopher Gian-Cursio (1960 Vegetarian Party vice-presidential nominee)

1964
  Symon Gould (nominated as 1964 Vegetarian Party candidate for president; however, Gould died in 1963) 

  Abram Wolfson (1964 Vegetarian Party vice-presidential nominee)

References

External links
 The American Vegetarian Union

Political parties established in 1947
Vegetarian organizations
 Defunct political parties in the United States
1947 establishments in the United States
 Vegetarianism in the United States